Marion Sayle Taylor (August 16, 1889 in Morrilton, Arkansas – February 1, 1942 in Hollywood, California) operated a radio advice show on  CBS, then NBC and finally on Mutual.  He was President of the Hygienic Orificial Co., Inc, in Chicago, Illinois.  Dr. Taylor authored a series of books on sexual hygiene, including the following titles:

 Pre-determination of Sex and Natural Birth Control
 How To Know Your Affinity
 Sex Vigor for Men:  How Retained, How Regained
 Facts for Wives
 Social Diseases:  A National Menace
 The Story of Life and How to Tell It to Children
 Sex Knowledge for Children
 The Secret of Youth and Charm:  Plain Sex Truths for Women
 The Lindsey-Taylor Debate on Marriage
 The Male Motor

Sources 
 I Knew the Voice of Experience Carroll Atkinson
 Lies, Sex and Radio Story of M. Sayle Taylor The Voice of Experience by J.R. and J.K. Wagner (2013)
 
 http://ideoformsindications.blogspot.co.nz/2011/01/marion-sayle-taylor.html
 http://utpress.utexas.edu/index.php/books/fowbor

People from Morrilton, Arkansas
1889 births
1942 deaths